Andrei Nikolayevich Boltnev  (January 5, 1946, Ufa —  May 12, 1995, Moscow) was a Soviet and Russian actor.

Biography 
Andrei Boltnev was born January 5, 1946, in Ufa.

Andrei Boltnev's grandfather, Konstantin Dobzhinsky was People's Artist of Georgia, and his grandmother, Nina Irtenev - Honored Artist of the RSFSR. In his birth certificate, the future actor was recorded as Andrei   Tusov. But his father, Vyacheslav Tusov died in 1951, when Andrei was 5 years old, and stepfather of Andrei Nikolay Boltnev, a sea captain, appeared in his life.

Boltnev studied in the Yaroslavl Theatre School from 1970 to 1972. After graduation he worked in theaters Ussuriysk, Maikop and Novosibirsk. In 1985 he graduated from the Ostrovsky Theatre and Art Institute in Tashkent.

Boltnev first appeared on the silver screen in 1983 when he played the role of the vibrant Captain Gavrilov in the film by Semyon Aranovich Torpedo Bombers.

The actor became widely known after the film My Friend Ivan Lapshin directed in 1984 by Aleksei German was released, in which Boltnev starred in the title role.

The real popularity was brought to Boltnev by the television series Confrontation (1985) based on the novel by Julian Semyonov, where Andrei Boltnev played a major role, the traitor Krotov.

In 1985, the actor who worked then in Novosibirsk, received an invitation to the metropolitan Mayakovsky Theatre.

Boltnev died in his sleep of a stroke in Moscow on May 12, 1995. He was buried in Moscow, Vostryakovsky Cemetery.

Selected filmography                                    
 1983 —  Torpedo Bombers as engineer captain Gavrilov
 1984 —  Mikhailo Lomonosov as Kargopolsky
 1984  —  My Friend Ivan Lapshin as Ivan Lapshin
 1985 — Confrontation   as Nikolai Ivanovich Krotov
 1986/88 — The Life of Klim Samgin as gendarme Colonel Popov
 1988 — The 13th Apostle as inspector
 1989 — Who Lives... as Captain Sviderskiy
 1989 — Hard to Be a God as Budach
 1989 — Abduction of the Wizard as Landmaster Friedrich von Kockenhausen
 1990 — Day of Love as Nikolai Ivanovich Kashin
 1991 — My Best Friend, General Vasili, Son of Joseph Stalin as  Astafiev
 1993 — The Mafia is Immortal as Aleksei Drobyshev

Awards
 Vasilyev Brothers State Prize of the RSFSR

References

External links
 

1946 births
1995 deaths
Soviet male film actors
Russian male film actors
Recipients of the Vasilyev Brothers State Prize of the RSFSR
People from Ufa